Synacroloxis is a monotypic moth genus in the family Scythrididae described by László Anthony Gozmány in 1952. Its only species, Synacroloxis dis, described by the same author in the same year, is found in Hungary.

References

Scythrididae
Moths described in 1952
Monotypic moth genera